Rudolph the Red-Nosed Reindeer is a soundtrack album to the 1964 Rankin/Bass television special of the same name.  The original cast recordings from the TV special (side "A" of the original LP release) are supplemented with instrumental versions recorded by the Decca Concert Orchestra (on side "B") on the Compact Disc version.  All songs used in the television special were written by Johnny Marks.

The original LP album was first released in 1964, and reissued as a CD in 1995.  The CD was certified Gold by the RIAA on November 30, 2004. The album has sold 1,411,200 copies in the United States since 1991 when SoundScan began tracking sales.

Track listing 
LP side A:
 Overture and "A Holly Jolly Christmas" – 2:23	
 "Jingle Jingle Jingle" – 1:13	
 "We Are Santa's Elves" – 1:31	
 "There's Always Tomorrow" – 1:42	
 "We're a Couple of Misfits" – 1:18	
 "Silver and Gold" – 1:42	
 "The Most Wonderful Day of the Year" – 2:18	
 "A Holly Jolly Christmas" – 1:18	
 "Rudolph the Red-Nosed Reindeer" Finale – 1:19	

LP side B (instrumental versions):
 "Rudolph the Red-Nosed Reindeer" – 1:50	
 "There's Always Tomorrow – 2:22	
 "Jingle Jingle Jingle" – 2:14	
 "We're a Couple of Misfits" – 1:50	
 "Silver and Gold" – 2:21	
 "We Are Santa's Elves" - 1:09	
 "Most Wonderful Day of the Year" – 2:22	
 "A Holly Jolly Christmas" – 1:32	
 Christmas Medley: "The Night Before Christmas Song" / "A Merry Merry Christmas" / "When Santa Claus Gets Your Letter" / "Rockin' Around The Christmas Tree" – 3:17	
 "I Heard the Bells on Christmas Day" – 1:41

 On the re-issue on CD, contents / track order are the same except the "Christmas Medley" is placed in the middle, at track 10 (between A9 and B1 - the Burl Ives' sung and instrumental versions of "Rudolph the Red-Nosed Reindeer").
 The brand-new song "Fame and Fortune", which replaced "We're a Couple of Misfits" in airings of the television special from 1965 through until the special was restored in 1998, does not appear on the soundtrack album.

Voices and personnel 
 Burl Ives – voice of Sam the Snowman ("A Holly Jolly Christmas," "Silver and Gold," "Rudolph the Red-Nosed Reindeer")
 Stan Francis – voice of Santa Claus ("Jingle, Jingle, Jingle")
 Janis Orenstein – voice of Clarice  ("There's Always Tomorrow")
 Billie Mae Richards – voice of Rudolph ("We're A Couple Of Misfits")
 Paul Soles – voice of Hermey ("We're A Couple Of Misfits")
 Maury Laws – musical director of the Videocraft TV Musical
 Decca Concert Orchestra (side B instrumentals)
 Herbert Rehbein – conductor, Decca Concert Orchestra

Charts

Weekly charts

Year-end charts

Notes

References

External links
 Decca DL 34327 (original LP) at discogs.com
 MCA 15003 (1980 LP re-issue) at discogs.com
 MCAD 22177 (1995 CD re-issue) at amazon.com
 Soundtrack at internet movie database (imdb.com)

1964 Christmas albums
1964 soundtrack albums
Decca Records soundtracks
MCA Records soundtracks
Television animation soundtracks